Dominique Dropsy (9 December 1951 – 7 October 2015) was a French professional footballer who played as a goalkeeper.

He played 596 Ligue 1 matches over 17 seasons, which stood as a record for several years, and won three national championships during his career, two with Bordeaux.

Dropsy represented France at the 1978 World Cup.

Club career
Born in Leuze, Aisne, Dropsy started his senior career with Valenciennes FC. He contributed 19 games in the 1971–72 season, helping the club return to Ligue 1 and win its first Ligue 2 championship in the process.

Dropsy signed with RC Strasbourg Alsace in the summer of 1973. During his 11-year spell at the Stade de la Meinau he never played less than 31 matches, appearing in all 38 in the 1978–79 campaign as the team conquered their first-ever domestic league.

Aged 34, Dropsy joined FC Girondins de Bordeaux, where he remained until his retirement always as first choice. He won a further two national championships, and added two Coupe de France to his trophy cabinet. Subsequently, he worked with his last club as a goalkeeper coach.

International career
Dropsy played 17 times for the France national team in three years. He was selected as an uncapped member for the 1978 FIFA World Cup squad, benefitting from injury to his former Strasbourg teammate André Rey; in the last group phase fixture, as both countries had already been eliminated, he appeared in the 3–1 win against Hungary in Mar del Plata.

Personal life
Dropsy's son, Damien (born 1983), was also a footballer and a goalkeeper. He never played the sport professionally, his biggest achievement being signing a short-term contract with Bordeaux in 2006 to serve as fourth choice.

In 2012, Damien played the role of a footballer in Olivier Dahan's motion picture Les Seigneurs.

Health problems and death
After suffering an aneurysm in 2005, medical exams revealed Dropsy had been struck with leukemia in March 2011. After recovering initially the following year, the 63-year-old died in Bordeaux on 7 October 2015.

References

External links

RC Strasbourg archives 

1951 births
2015 deaths
Sportspeople from Aisne
French footballers
Association football goalkeepers
Ligue 1 players
Ligue 2 players
Valenciennes FC players
RC Strasbourg Alsace players
FC Girondins de Bordeaux players
France international footballers
1978 FIFA World Cup players
Deaths from leukemia
Deaths from cancer in France
Footballers from Hauts-de-France